Goasi, previously known as Chunapur, is a village in the Purnea district of India. This village is under the K nagar block. The air force station A.F.S. Goasi is near the village. Goasi is near to the Kalikoshi river, a tributary of the river Koshi. There are twelve wards in the village.

At the time of the 2001 census, there were 1,475 households in Goasi.
The main occupation of its occupants is agriculture. Hindu people live in the community. Some engineers and doctors also live in the village.

See also 
 List of villages in Araria

References

External links
http://www.mapsofindia.com/pincode/india/bihar/purnia/

Villages in Araria district